Marion Correctional Institution is a state prison for men in unincorporated Marion County, Florida, near Ocala. It is owned and operated by the Florida Department of Corrections.  The facility houses a maximum of 1324 inmates at a mix of security levels.  It stands near to Florida's Florida Women's Reception Center and Lowell Correctional Institution, both women's facilities.

References

Prisons in Florida
Buildings and structures in Marion County, Florida
1976 establishments in Florida